Joseph Neubauer (born October 19, 1941 in Mandatory Palestine) is an American businessman and the former CEO of Aramark Corporation. Before joining Aramark, he served as vice-president at PepsiCo and Chase Manhattan Bank. Neubauer is listed at #82 on Fortune's top paid CEO list. As a CEO he was able to lead Aramark to a successful fiscal year in 2010, generating around 12.6 billion dollars in revenue. He was elected to the American Philosophical Society in 2007. In December 2014, Neubauer announced his retirement from Aramark.

Philanthropy
Neubauer and his wife, Jeanette Lerman-Neubauer, are the founding donors of the Neubauer Family Collegium for Culture and Society at the University of Chicago. They also fund the Neubauer Family Foundation, based in Philadelphia, Pennsylvania. Through his Neubauer Family foundation, he was a key financial supporter of the Pew Research Center's 2013 and 2020 surveys of American Jews; and is a supporter of Brandeis University, the Jewish Theological Seminary of America, and Jewish museums in Berlin, Warsaw, and Israel.

References 

American chief executives of food industry companies
Living people
1941 births
Israeli Jews
Israeli emigrants to the United States
University of Chicago Booth School of Business alumni
Tufts University alumni
Tufts University School of Engineering alumni
American chief executives of Fortune 500 companies